Ray W. Hays (June 14, 1889 – April 5, 1976) was a Republican state senator who served in the California legislature for the 30th District. During World War I he served as an officer in the American Expeditionary Force. While in the Senate, he served on the government efficiency committee. Hays is buried in Willamette National Cemetery in Portland, Oregon.

References

External links
Join California Ray W. Hays

1889 births
1976 deaths
United States Army personnel of World War I
20th-century American politicians
Republican Party California state senators